State funerals in Ireland have taken place on the following occasions since 1922.

List

State funerals declined and refused
Former Taoisigh John A. Costello and Liam Cosgrave did not receive state funerals, at the request of their respective families. Similarly, a 1948 press release at the repatriation by LÉ Macha of the remains of W. B. Yeats, who had died in France in 1939, stated "The Government was, of course, desirous to accord full State honours in connection with the funeral, but considered it proper to respect the wishes of the poet's relatives." A state funeral was offered after the assassination of UK ambassador Christopher Ewart-Biggs in 1976; his widow agreed instead to a memorial service.

There was minimal official support for the 1970 reburial of men killed in India in the 1920 Connaught Rangers Mutiny. Arguments against a state funeral were that the 1966 Casement funeral not a precedent but rather symbolic of all who died abroad for Ireland; that the mutineers' profile was too low for major recognition; and that it might be seen as endorsing republican paramilitary action in the Troubles in Northern Ireland. While the government facilitated  repatriation of the remains, the ensuing funerals were privately arranged by the National Graves Association.

Protocol

Lying in state is only organised for a sitting taoiseach or president.

The church service (if Catholic) may feature a Solemn Mass, usually attended by current and past presidents, taoisigh and senior members of the Irish judiciary.

About 300 members of the Defence Forces provide a guard of honour, a gun-carriage carries the coffin, which is draped with the tricolour, and Army Buglers play the Last Post. There is a gun-salute.

References

Footnotes

Sources

Citations

+Ireland
State funerals
Funerals in the Republic of Ireland